In mathematics, Fenchel–Nielsen coordinates are coordinates for  Teichmüller space introduced by Werner Fenchel and Jakob Nielsen.

Definition

Suppose that S is a compact Riemann surface of genus g > 1. The Fenchel–Nielsen coordinates  depend on a choice of 6g − 6 curves on S, as follows. The Riemann surface S can be divided up into 2g − 2 pairs of pants by cutting along 3g − 3 disjoint simple closed curves. For each of these 3g − 3 curves γ, choose an arc crossing it that ends in other boundary components of the pairs of pants with boundary containing γ.

The Fenchel–Nielsen coordinates for a point of the Teichmüller space of S consist of 3g − 3 positive real numbers called the lengths and 3g − 3 real numbers called the twists. A point of Teichmüller space is represented by a hyperbolic metric on S.

The lengths of the Fenchel–Nielsen coordinates are the lengths of geodesics homotopic to  the 3g − 3 disjoint simple closed curves.

The twists of the Fenchel–Nielsen coordinates are given as follows. There is one twist for each of the 3g − 3 curves crossing one of the 3g − 3 disjoint simple closed curves γ. Each of these is homotopic to a curve that consists of 3 geodesic segments, the middle one of which  follows the geodesic of γ. The twist is the (positive or negative) distance the middle segment travels along the geodesic of γ.

References

Riemann surfaces